The Church of Saint Hripsime is a 9th to 13th century Armenian Apostolic church in Mujumbar, Shabestar County, East Azerbaijan Province, Iran. It abandoned in 1947 when the Armenian population of Mujumbar moved to Tabriz or Soviet Armenia.

References

See also 
 List of Armenian churches in Iran

Armenian Apostolic churches in Iran
Churches in Iran
Buildings and structures in East Azerbaijan Province